Prosopocoilus antilope is a species of beetles of the family Lucanidae.

Description

Distribution
This species occurs in Benin, Cameroon, Central African Republic, Democratic Republic of the Congo, Equatorial Guinea, Gabon, Ghana, Guinea, Ivory Coast, Liberia, Republic of the Congo, Rwanda, Senegal, Sierra Leone and Tanzania.

References
 Biolib

antilope
Beetles described in 1787
Beetles of Africa